Dolichol phosphate-mannose biosynthesis regulatory protein is a protein that in humans is encoded by the DPM2 gene.

Function 

Dolichol-phosphate mannose (Dol-P-Man) serves as a donor of mannosyl residues on the lumenal side of the endoplasmic reticulum (ER). Lack of Dol-P-Man results in defective surface expression of GPI-anchored proteins, defective N-linked glycosylation and deficient O-mannosylation of α-dystroglycan. Dol-P-Man is synthesized from GDP-mannose and dolichol-phosphate on the cytosolic side of the ER by the enzyme dolichyl-phosphate mannosyltransferase. The protein encoded by this gene is a hydrophobic protein that contains 2 predicted transmembrane domains and a putative ER localization signal near the C-terminus. This protein associates with DPM1 in vivo and is required for the ER localization and stable expression of DPM1 and also enhances the binding of dolichol-phosphate to DPM1.

Clinical significance 
Mutations in this gene are associated with congenital disorder of glycosylation.

References

Further reading

Human proteins